Léonor-Jean-Christin Soulas d'Allainval, called abbé d'Allainval, (c. 1700, in Chartres – 2 May 1753, in Hôtel-Dieu de Paris) was an 18th-century French playwright.

Life 
He lived all his life in misery and died an indigent. None of his plays were successful, except for a very short time his first comedy, L'Embarras des richesses, played four times in Paris during his lifetime and later considered a comedy "well conducted and well untied" and "one of his best works". Only L'École des bourgeois brought him posthumous fame. Presented for the first time at the Comédie-Française in 1728, the play was revived only sixteen years after his death and played intermittently between 1769 and 1848. In 1854, it inspired Émile Augier and Jules Sandeau a new comedy which was like a sequel.

Works 
Theatre
1725: L'Embarras des richesses, three-act comedy, Paris, Hôtel de Bourgogne, 9 July. Rrprint: Espaces 34, Montpellier, 2006. Read online
1726: Le Tour de Carnaval, one-act comedy, Paris, Théâtre de l'hôtel de Bourgogne, 24 February Read online
1726: La Fausse Comtesse, comedy in prose, Paris, Théâtre de la rue des Fossés Saint-Germain, 27 July
1727: Le Tour de carnaval, one-act comedy, Paris, Théâtre de l'hôtel de Bourgogne
1728: L'École des bourgeois, three-act comedy with prologue, Paris, Théâtre de la rue des Fossés Saint-Germain, 20 September reprint: Espaces 34, Montpellier, 2006. Read online
1729: Les Réjouissances publiques, ou le Gratis, one-act comedy, Paris, Théâtre de la rue des Fossés Saint-Germain, 18 September
1731: Le Mari curieux, one-act comedy, Paris, Théâtre de la rue des Fossés Saint-Germain, 17 July
1733: L'Hiver, one-act comedy, Paris, Théâtre de l'hôtel de Bourgogne, 19 February
1734: La Fée Marote, opéra-ballet in one act, Paris, Foire Saint-Laurent, 28 August
1747Le Jugement de Pâris, ou le Triomphe de la beauté, one-act comedy, Théâtre de Toulouse, 1 July 
Varia
1730: Lettre à mylord *** on Baron and demoiselle Le Couvreur, où l'on trouve plusieurs particularités théâtrales, by Georges Wink. Reprint: Slatkine, Geneva, 1968. Read online
1732–1733: Ana (Allainvaliana), ou Bigarrures calotines
1745: Anecdotes du regne de Pierre premier, dit le grand, czar de Moscovie, contenant l'histoire d'Eudochia Federowna, & la disgrace du prince de Mencikow
1746: Anecdotes du regne de Pierre premier, dit le grand, czar de Moscovie, contenant son ordonnance du 10-21 février 1720, pour la réformation de son clergé
1785: Œuvres de l'abbé d'Allainval

See also 
 Embarrassment of riches

References

External links 
His plays and their presentations on CÉSAR.
Léonor Jean Christine Soulas d'Allainval on Data.bnf.fr
Site dédié à la vie et à l'œuvre de Soulas d'Allainval, où un ouvrage "Un littérateur et son théâtre au XVIIIe siècle" lui est consacré

18th-century French dramatists and playwrights
1700 births
Writers from Chartres
1753 deaths